Pell Mell may refer to:
 Pell Mell, a German progressive rock band formed in 1971 in Marburg, Germany
 Pell Mell (band), a US instrumental rock music ensemble formed 1980 in Portland, Oregon
 Pel Mel, an Australian new wave/post-punk band formed in 1979 in Newcastle, New South Wales
 Pell-Mell & Woodcote, the Royal Automobile Club's quarterly magazine

See also
 Pall mall (disambiguation)
 Pel Mel, Australian post-punk band